The Gambia competed at the 1988 Summer Olympics in Seoul, South Korea. The Gambia sent 6 athletes, 5 male and 1 female to compete in two sports, athletics and wrestling.

Competitors
The following is the list of number of competitors in the Games.

Athletics

The Gambia sent three athletes.

Men

Women

Wrestling

The Gambia sent three wrestlers.
Men's freestyle

References

External links
 

Gambia
1988
Oly